The CMLL World Lightweight Championship is a professional wrestling world championship promoted by the Consejo Mundial de Lucha Libre (CMLL), a Mexican Lucha Libre wrestling promotion (franchise). Originally, CMLL promoted the "Super Lightweight" division as part of their expansion into Japan in 1999 and 2000 and later reintroduced the division in 2003, at the same time they were running a CMLL World Super Lightweight Championship in Mexico. During Máscara Dorada's reign between 2009 and 2011, the name was changed to the CMLL Lightweight Championship, adjusting the weight limit.

There is currently no CMLL World Lightweight Champion as CMLL vacated the championship after previous champion Kawato-San suffered a knee injury and could not compete for four months. The first CMLL Japan Super Lightweight Champion was Masato Yakushiji, who won it on February 27, 1999. The belt that represents the championship is the original one used in Japan in 1999 and 2000 and has not been updated to reflect the change in weight divisions. As it is a professional wrestling championship, it is won not by actual competition, but by a scripted ending to a match.

Background

Lucha libre, or professional wrestling, is a form of entertainment where matches are presented as being competitive, but the outcome of the matches are pre-determined by their promoters. As part of presenting lucha libre as a genuine combat sport, promoters create championships that are used in the storylines presented on their shows, they are not won as result of genuinely competitive matches. The championship is represented by a belt for the champion to wear before or after a match.

The Mexican professional wrestling promotion Consejo Mundial de Lucha Libre (CMLL; "World Wrestling Council") introduced the CMLL Japan Super Lightweight Championship in 1999 and later renamed it the CMLL World Super Lightweight Championship in 2003. Mexican regulations define several weight classes, owing to its amateur wrestling roots. In 2011 CMLL decided to adjust the weight class, changing the name to the "CMLL World Lightweight Championship. CMLL has at times ignored official the weight limit, giving the championship to heavier wrestlers, for example, Dragon Lee was billed as weighing  when he won the championship. All championship matches promoted in Mexico take place under best two-out-of-three falls rules. On occasion, single-fall title matches have taken place, especially when promoting CMLL title matches in Japan, conforming to the traditions of the local promotion.

History

In 1999, CMLL began to tour Japan, promoting a series of wrestling shows under the name "CMLL Japan". The shows featured a mixture of CMLL and Japanese wrestlers. On February 27, 1999, CMLL held a one-night tournament to determine who would be the inaugural CMLL Japan Super Lightweight Champion, marking the first time in the history of CMLL that they used a championship specifically for that weight class. The tournament finale saw the Japanese Masato Yakushiji defeat CMLL wrestler Rencor Latino to become the first champion. The following year, CMLL promoted additional shows in Japan, during which CMLL wrestler Virus won the championship from Yakushiji. Virus and Ricky Marvin, a Mexican who was working for Japanese promotions at the time, exchanged the title in the fall of 2000. The last title match between the two took place in Acapulco, Guerrero, Mexico, after CMLL's last tour of Japan. The championship was discontinued by the end of 2000, as CMLL stopped promoting shows in Japan.

In 2003, CMLL reinstated the super lightweight championship after a series of well-received matches between the Southern California team the Havana Brothers (Havana Brothers I, Havana Brother II and Havana Brother III) and the CMLL team of Ricky Marvin, Virus, and Volador Jr. CMLL announced they were establishing the CMLL World Super Lightweight Championship, elevating the championship from a regional to a "World" level championship. CMLL held a torneo cibernetico elimination match, which included the Havana Brothers, Sangre Azteca, Ricky Marvin, Virus, Volador Jr., Super Comando, Loco Max, Tigre Blanco, Neutro and Sombra de Plata. Havana Brother I won the tournament—and thus the championship—by eliminating Volador Jr. A few months later, Virus defeated Havana Brother I for the championship, after which the Havana Brothers stopped working for CMLL.

In subsequent years, the championship was not defended, nor referred to by CMLL. In 2004, Havana Brother I returned to CMLL, this time working without a mask under the name Rocky Romero. CMLL openly acknowledged that Romero had previously worked as "Havana Brother I" and was a former champion as part of a buildup to a championship rematch between Romero and Virus. Romero became a two-time champion on December 10, 2004, but stopped working for CMLL shortly after the match. CMLL made no attempts to retrieve the championship from Romero at that time. Romero would on occasion defend the super lightweight championship on the Southern California independent circuit. In 2005, he lost the championship to Tommy Williams in a match that received no mainstream coverage; the title change was only reported on after the match. Romero regained the title from Tommy Williams and only defended it once after winning it, on a New Japan Pro-Wrestling Dojo show in California.  When Romero returned to CMLL in 2008, it was as an enmascarado (masked character) called "Grey Shadow", with no public acknowledgment of his history with CMLL as he never wore nor defended the championship.

The CMLL World Super Lightweight Championship was not officially declared vacant until Romero left CMLL to work for their rival AAA. CMLL held a tournament to crown a new champion, and on April 7, 2009, Máscara Dorada won a torneo cibernetico elimination match for the super lightweight championship. During Máscara Dorada's reign, the weight class was adjusted from the "Super Lightweight" to simply the "Lightweight" division, expanding the official weight limit of the championship. In 2011, Máscara Dorada vacated the championship when he announced that he was moving up to the middleweight division instead. Virus became a four-time champion on June 7, 2011, after defeating Guerrero Maya Jr. in the finals of a tournament, making him the only wrestler to have held all three versions of the championship. His fourth reign lasted from June 2011 to April 5, 2015, when he lost the championship to Dragon Lee. On January 23, 2016, Dragon Lee defended the championship on the 2016 Fantastica Mania tour of Japan, marking the first time since 2000 that the championship was defended in Japan. The following day, Dragon Lee's first reign came to an end as he lost the championship to Kamaitachi on the final day of the Fantastica Mania tour. 40 days after winning the championship from Dragon Lee, Kamaitachi lost the championship back to Dragon Lee during CMLL's weekly Super Viernes show on March 4, 2016. On June 14, 2019, Dragon Lee announced that he was vacating the championship to focus on defending the CMLL World Welterweight Championship that he also held at the time of the announcement.

Reigns
The championship is currently vacant after it was stripped from Kawato-San on November 6, 2019. Eight different wrestlers have held the championship for fifteen reigns in total. Virus holds the record for most reigns, with four: two in Japan and two in Mexico. He held the title for a total of 2,046 days, more than any other champion, and his fourth reign lasted 1,398 days, the longest individual reign. Ricky Marvin had the shortest individual reign, lasting somewhere between 1 day to  days. The belt that represents the championship has not been updated since the days of the CMLL Japan Super Lightweight Championship; the faceplate still reads "Super Ligero" as well as "Japan".

Title history

Combined reigns

Footnotes

References

External links
 CMLL World Lightweight Championship

Consejo Mundial de Lucha Libre championships
Lightweight wrestling championships
World professional wrestling championships